Gambino is an Italian surname. Notable persons with that surname include:

Surname
  (1899–1987), Argentine conductor
 Antonella Gambino (born 1990), Argentinian handball player
 Domenico Gambino (1890–1968), Italian actor, screenwriter, and film director
 Giuseppe Gambino (born 1968), Swiss football defender
 Lu Gambino (1923–2003), American football player
 Mike Gambino (born 1977), college baseball coach
 Raffaello Gambino (1928–1989), Italian water polo player
 Richard Gambino, American author and educator
 Richard J. Gambino (born 1935), American material scientist
 Roberto Gambino (born 1962), Italian architect and politician
 Salvatore Gambino (born 1983), Italian-German football player
 Some members of the Gambino crime family, including:
 Carlo Gambino (1902–1976), New York mobster and former boss of the crime family
 , New York mobster and nephew of Carlo Gambino
 Giuseppe Giacomo Gambino (1941–1996), member of the Mafia and head of the San Lorenzo mandamento
 John Gambino (1940–2017), Sicilian mobster who operated in New Jersey
 Rosario Gambino (born 1942), Sicilian mobster imprisoned on drug charges
 Thomas Gambino (born 1929), son of Carlo Gambino and caporegime in the Gambino crime family

Other uses 
 Childish Gambino, a stage name of Donald Glover (born 1983), American actor, comedian, and musician 
 Gambino Family (group), an American hip hop group

See also 
 Gambito

Italian-language surnames